Deh Redin (also Romanized as  Deh Redīn, Deh-e Redīn, and Deh Radīn; also known as Deh Rerīn and Dūrdīn) is a village in Deh Bakri Rural District, in the Central District of Bam County, Kerman Province, Iran. At the 2006 census, its population was 130, in 32 families.

References 

Populated places in Bam County